The Rolls-Royce 25/30 built between 1936 and 1938 is an updated version of the 20/25 with larger engine to provide more power, as over-large bodies had often been fitted to the earlier model leading to complaints about its performance.

Engineering
The compression ratio is 6:1. A single proprietary Stromberg downdraught carburettor replaced the Rolls-Royce one, and magneto ignition was no longer fitted, but a standby coil was provided. The four-speed gearbox is mounted in unit with the engine, and a traditional right-hand change used. Synchromesh is fitted to third and top gears.

The riveted chassis has rigid front and rear axles suspended by half-elliptic springs with hydraulic dampers. Braking is on all four wheels assisted by a mechanical servo, famously under licence of Hispano-Suiza. Separate rear brakes are fitted for the handbrake. The traditional Rolls-Royce radiator with triangular top was used with vertical louvres, the opening angle of which is controlled thermostatically to control engine cooling.

Bodywork
Only the rolling chassis and mechanical parts were made by Rolls-Royce. The body was made and fitted by a coachbuilder selected by the owner. Some of the most famous coachbuilders who produced bodies for Rolls-Royce cars are Park Ward, Thrupp & Maberly, H. J. Mulliner & Co., Arthur Mulliner and Hooper.

Movie appearances
This Rolls-Royce appears in films such as The Naked Truth (1957), Death on the Nile (1978), and several others. Although the sultan in Indiana Jones and the Last Crusade (1989) calls his car a Phantom II, the technical details he recites are those of the 25/30. However, the actual on-screen car was neither; it was a 1935 20/25.

See also

References

25 30
1930s cars
Cars introduced in 1936